Seabee Heights  is a rugged snow-covered heights rising to  in the Queen Maud Mountains. Named by Advisory Committee on Antarctic Names (US-ACAN) for the U.S. Navy Construction Battalions (Seabees) which have played a significant role in the building of U.S. Antarctic stations.

References

Mountains of the Ross Dependency
Dufek Coast